Patrick Johnson (born 26 September 1972 in Cairns, Queensland, Australia) is an Australian athlete of Aboriginal and Irish descent. He is the current Oceanian and Australian record holder in the 100 metres with a time of 9.93 seconds, which he achieved in Mito, Japan, on 5 May 2003. With that time he became the first person not of African ancestry to break the 10-second barrier (Frankie Fredericks, a Namibian, had been the first non-West-African in 1991). The time made him the 17th fastest man in history at the time and 38th man to crack the 10-second barrier. He was regarded as the fastest man of non-African descent before Christophe Lemaitre ran 9.92 seconds in French National Championships in Albi on 29 July 2011.

He reached the finals in both the 100 and 200 metres at the 2006 Commonwealth Games, and the 200m final in the 2005 World Championships, where he finished 6th.  He represented Australia at the Olympic Games in 2000. He finished his career with one Commonwealth Games medal: a bronze in the 4 × 100 metres relay at the 2002 Commonwealth Games.

Personal life
Johnson's mother was a Kaanju Indigenous Australian and his father is Irish. He was born on a speed boat en route to Cairns base hospital. His mother died when he was young, so he grew up on his father's mackerel trawler, and spent his childhood travelling the coast of Cape York with his siblings. A chance entry into a 100m race in Queensland in his early 20s revealed his talent, and he later won a scholarship to attend the Australian Institute of Sport in Canberra. His career in athletics was somewhat shortened by his age, and he later worked in the Australian diplomatic service, and in Indigenous health.

In 2018, Johnson contributed a chapter entitled 'My Life's Voyage' to the 2018 biographical anthology Growing Up Aboriginal In Australia, edited by Anita Heiss and published by Black Inc.

Personal bests

International competition record

References

External links 
 
 Patrick Johnson at Australian Athletics Historical Results
 Australian Story - ABC TV

1972 births
Living people
Australian male sprinters
Australian people of Irish descent
Athletes (track and field) at the 2000 Summer Olympics
Athletes (track and field) at the 2004 Summer Olympics
Olympic athletes of Australia
Athletes (track and field) at the 2002 Commonwealth Games
Athletes (track and field) at the 2006 Commonwealth Games
Athletes (track and field) at the 2010 Commonwealth Games
Indigenous Australian Olympians
Sportspeople from Cairns
Australian Institute of Sport track and field athletes
Indigenous Australian track and field athletes
Commonwealth Games medallists in athletics
Commonwealth Games bronze medallists for Australia
Medallists at the 2002 Commonwealth Games